Lord Raingo is a 1966 British TV series based on a novel of the same name by Arnold Bennett.

Premise
In 1918, a northern tycoon is offered a ministry by the Prime Minister.

Cast
 Kenneth More as Sam Raingo
 Janet Suzman as Delphine, Raingo's mistress
 Joseph O'Connor as PM Andy Clyth
 Diana Churchill as Raingo's wife
 Joss Ackland

Episodes

Production
It was the first of several mini series Kenneth More made for the BBC, later ones including The Forsyth Saga and The White Rabbit.

Reception
The Guardian praised its "strong story and extraordinarily interesting characters." The Observer said "you really want to know what happens next."

References

External links
 Complete book at Public Library
 Lord Raingo at BFI
 

1960s British drama television series